KVOW (1450 AM) is a radio station broadcasting a Talk/Personality format. Licensed to Riverton, Wyoming, United States, the station is currently owned by Edwards Communications, Lc.

References

External links

Talk radio stations in the United States
VOW
ESPN Radio stations
Radio stations established in 1948
1982 establishments in Wyoming